New World Disorder is a 1999 American thriller/action film directed by Richard Spence. It features Rutger Hauer, Andrew McCarthy,
Tara Fitzgerald, and Hari Dhillon. It was filmed in Luxembourg.

Plot
Homicide detective David Marx (Rutger Hauer) teams up with computer expert Kris Paddock (Tara Fitzgerald) to track down a gang stealing computer chips from a list of factories.

Cast
 Rutger Hauer as Detective David Marx
 Andrew McCarthy as Kurt Bishop
 Tara Fitzgerald as Kris Paddock
 Hari Dhillon as Mark Ohai
 Alun Ragland as Michael 'Fury' Dietrich
 Ian Butcher as Quark
 Brian Van Camp as Coltrane
 Anthony Warren as Nakamoto
 Martin McDougall as Sullivan 
 Nicholas Pinnock as Weldon
 John Sharian as Rice
 Branwell Donaghey as Leo Galileo
 Lawrence Elman as Maximillian Biggs
 Michelle Gomez as Annika 'Amethyst' Rains
 Annaleisa M. Graham as Gloria 'Gigabite'
 Vincent Rappa as FBI Agent #1
 Radica Vujicin as Escort Girl (uncredited)

References

External links

1999 films
Films with screenplays by Ehren Kruger
1990s English-language films
American action thriller films
1990s American films